On Stage (subtitled February, 1970) is a live album by American singer Elvis Presley, released on RCA Records LSP-4362 in June 1970. It was recorded between February 17 and 19, 1970 and August 22 and 25, 1969 at the International Hotel, Las Vegas, Nevada. The album reached number 13 on both the Billboard 200 and country music charts. It was certified Gold on February 23, 1971, and Platinum on July 15, 1999, by the Recording Industry Association of America.

Content
On Stage was an immediate follow up to From Memphis to Vegas/From Vegas to Memphis, which also featured live recordings. Unlike the previous release, however, this album focused on songs that were not, at the time, associated with Elvis.

The album features the worldwide number one single "The Wonder of You", which topped both the United States Adult Contemporary tracks chart and the British music chart. Other selections include "See See Rider", "Yesterday", Tony Joe White's "Polk Salad Annie", Del Shannon's "Runaway", and a version of "Let It Be Me". "See See Rider" would go on to become Elvis' frequent introductory number at his concerts up to his last performance at the (now defunct) Market Square Arena in Indianapolis Indiana on June 26, 1977, while "Polk Salad Annie" also became a regular part of his repertoire. The album is notable for not showing Elvis' name anywhere on the cover.

The album has remained in print since its release date and has sold more than ten million copies globally. On January 8, 2010, it was announced that a Legacy Edition would be released, to follow the Legacy Edition release of From Elvis In Memphis in the spring of 2010.

Track listing

Original release

Extended Version

Legacy Edition
On March 23, 2010, the album was released in a two-disc Legacy Edition.  All tracks on disc two were recorded August 23–26, 1969.

The album was arranged by Bergen White, Glen D. Hardin and Glen Spreen

Personnel 
Sourced from Keith Flynn’s access to RCA and AFM paperwork.
 Elvis Presley – vocals, electric guitar, acoustic guitar
 James Burton – electric lead guitar
 John Wilkinson − electric rhythm guitar
 Charlie Hodge − acoustic rhythm guitar, backing vocals
 Glen D. Hardin − keyboards except “Runaway” and “Yesterday”
 Larry Muhoberac - keyboards on “Runaway” and “Yesterday”
 Jerry Scheff – bass
 Bob Lanning − drums except “Runaway” and “Yesterday”
 Ronnie Tutt – drums on “Runaway” and “Yesterday”
 Eddie Graham − percussion
 Millie Kirkham − backing vocals
 The Imperials − backing vocals
 The Sweet Inspirations − backing vocals
 Bobby Morris and his Orchestra - orchestra

Overdubbed:
 Mary Holladay, Ginger Holladay, Jeanie Greenie, Sandra Posey, Dolores Edgin, Ricki Page, Hurshel Wiginton, Joseph Babcock, James Glaser – additional backing vocals

References

External links

1970 live albums
Elvis Presley live albums
RCA Records live albums
Albums recorded at Westgate Las Vegas